Charlie Craven (2 December 1909 – 30 March 1972) was an English footballer who played as an inside left.

Born in Boston, Lincolnshire, Craven started his football career with local teams before joining Grimsby Town, with whom he won the Second Division in 1934. He went on to score 99 goals in 283 appearances in the top two divisions of the Football League for Grimsby, Manchester United, who paid £6,000 for his services in June 1938, and Birmingham, whom he joined only six months later. He was named as reserve for England for the match against Holland in 1935. He moved into non-League football with Tamworth shortly before the Second World War started, guested for Coventry City and Birmingham during the war, and left Tamworth for Sutton Town in 1951. He died in Solihull, Warwickshire at the age of 62.

Honours
Grimsby Town
Second Division: 1933–34

References

1909 births
People from Boston, Lincolnshire
1972 deaths
English footballers
Association football inside forwards
Boston Town F.C. (1920s) players
Grimsby Town F.C. players
Manchester United F.C. players
Birmingham City F.C. players
Tamworth F.C. players
Sutton Coldfield Town F.C. players
English Football League players